Cand. it., candidatus (male) or candidata (female) informationis technologiæ is a graduate academic title, which is used in Denmark. The English equivalent title is Master of Science in Information Technology.

The title describes a candidate with a multidisciplinary approach to computer science and computer related fields, and aspects of human science, social science, natural science and economics can be found in the study programmes that award the title.

In Denmark, the title can be obtained at the IT University of Copenhagen and through It-vest (a collaboration between several Danish universities).

See also
IT University of Copenhagen

External links
 http://www.itu.dk/
 http://www.it-vest.dk/

Professional titles and certifications